Struck is a surname. Notable people with the surname include:

Adolf Struck (1877–1911), German author
Hermann Struck (1876–1944), German artist 
Karin Struck (1947–2006), German author
Paul Struck (1776-1820), German composer
Peter Struck (politician) (1943–2012), German politician (SPD)
Peter Struck (classicist), professor at the University of Pennsylvania.

See also
Strikebreaker
Struck Oil (disambiguation)